Mum's the word is a popular English idiom. It is related to an expression used by William Shakespeare, in Henry VI, Part 2.

The word "mum" is an alteration of momme, which was used between 1350 and 1400 in Middle English with very close to the same meaning, "be silent; do not reveal".

Meaning 

"Mum's the word" means to keep silent or quiet.

Mum is a Middle English word meaning 'silent', and may be derived from the mummer who acts without speaking.
Note the similar English word "mime" (Old English "mīma", Latin "mimus") meaning silent actor or imitator.

Origin 

The origins of the phrase can be traced back to the fourteenth century and William Langland's narrative poem, Piers Plowman:

It can also be seen in popular fifteenth-century Towneley Plays:

The phrase notably appears in Shakespeare's Henry VI, Part 2, Act 1, Scene 2:

References 

English-language idioms